Igor Đokić (also transliterated Igor Djokić; born 7 March 1979) is a Serbian football midfielder who plays for Radnički Svilajnac in Serbian League East.

References

External links
 
 

1979 births
Living people
People from Svilajnac
Association football midfielders
Serbian footballers
FK Smederevo players
FK Radnički Niš players
Serbian SuperLiga players
Serbian expatriate footballers
Serbian expatriate sportspeople in Belgium
Expatriate footballers in Belgium
K.F.C. Lommel S.K. players
Belgian Pro League players